The Guandu Temple is a prominent Chinese temple in Beitou District of Taipei, Taiwan, dedicated the Goddess Mazu.

History
The temple was originally constructed in 1712. It was also known as Lingshan Temple due to its location at Mount Ling.

Architecture
The temple is filled with carved dragon pillars, stone lions and wall sculptures. The door gods are in the form of relief carvings. The rafters and beams are also carved and painted. The image of Mazu sits on the main altar.

Transportation
The temple is accessible within walking distance south of Guandu Station of Taipei Metro.

See also
 Qianliyan & Shunfeng'er
 List of Mazu temples around the world
 Ciyou Temple, Songshan District
 Bangka Lungshan Temple, Wanhua District
 Bangka Qingshui Temple, Wanhua District
 Dalongdong Baoan Temple, Datong District
 Xingtian Temple, Zhongshan District
 List of temples in Taiwan
 List of tourist attractions in Taiwan

References

External links 

 Guandu Temple

1661 establishments in Taiwan
Mazu temples built by Buddhists
Mazu temples in Taipei